Raymond Albert Busler (January 16, 1914 – October 9, 1969) was a player in the National Football League. He first played two seasons with the Chicago Cardinals. After three years away from the NFL, he was a member of the team during the 1945 NFL season.

References

1914 births
1969 deaths
American football tackles
Marquette Golden Avalanche football players
Chicago Cardinals players
Players of American football from Wisconsin
People from Watertown, Wisconsin